Martin Bladen Hawke, 2nd Baron Hawke (20 April 1744 – 27 March 1805), was a British peer and politician.

Background
Hawke was the son of Admiral Edward Hawke, 1st Baron Hawke, of Scarthingwell Hall, near Tadcaster, and of Catherine, the daughter of Walter Brooke. He was educated at Eton College and the Queen's College, Oxford, followed by the study of law at Lincoln's Inn.

Political career
Hawke sat as Member of Parliament for Saltash from 1768 to 1774. In 1781 he succeeded his father in the barony and entered the House of Lords.

Family
In 1771 Lord Hawke married Cassandra Turner, daughter of Sir Edward Turner, 2nd Baronet. They had two sons and four daughters. Lord Hawke died in March 1805, aged 60, and was succeeded by his eldest son, Edward. Lady Hawke died in November 1813.

References

1744 births
1805 deaths
People from Tadcaster
People educated at Eton College
Alumni of The Queen's College, Oxford
Members of Lincoln's Inn
Members of the Parliament of Great Britain for English constituencies
British MPs 1768–1774
Members of the Parliament of Great Britain for constituencies in Cornwall
2